Gundu is a Village Development Committee in Bhaktapur District in the Bagmati Zone of central Nepal. It is a part of the Suryabinayak Municipality. 

Gundu VDC is ward no. 7 of the Suryabinayak Municipality.

Governance 
The Ward Chairperson of Gundu is Rabindra Sapkota. Rabindra Sapkota won 2019 election again after his victory in 2014. He represents CPN (UML).

Demographics 
At the 1991 Nepal census, it had a population of 5,689, with 1,257 households.

References

Populated places in Bhaktapur District